Plattsville (Edward's Air Base) Aerodrome  is a registered aerodrome located  east of Plattsville, Ontario, Canada. It is home to the yearly Ultralight Pilots Association of Canada's convention typically held in August. The field also houses numerous aircraft and the Ayrborne Aviators club.

References

Registered aerodromes in Ontario
Transport in Oxford County, Ontario